The North Florida Ospreys men's basketball statistical leaders are individual statistical leaders of the North Florida Ospreys men's basketball program in various categories, including points, three-pointers, assists, blocks, rebounds, and steals. Within those areas, the lists identify single-game, single-season, and career leaders. The Ospreys represent the University of North Florida in the NCAA's ASUN Conference.

North Florida began competing in intercollegiate basketball in 1991.  These lists are updated through the end of the 2020–21 season.

Scoring

Rebounds

Assists

Steals

Blocks

References

Lists of college basketball statistical leaders by team
Statistical